What the Brokenhearted Do... is a 2019 album by American comedian Tim Heidecker focusing on the theme of romantic relationships and break-ups.

Recording and release
Heidecker wrote it in response to an Internet hoax that he was being divorced and released the work through Jagjaguwar. He held a poll on Twitter to name the album, ultimately deciding against Cuck and Tim Crydecker. A music video for "When I Get Up" was released to promote the album. Heidecker took a more serious approach to the recordings, particularly compared to previous albums such as In Glendale.

Reception

The editorial staff of All Music Guide gave the release four out of five stars, with critic Mark Deming possibly "most inspired example to date of how to respond to Internet trolling", writing that "Heidecker's voice is good, not great, but his phrasing and sense of drama is superb" and favorably comparing it to several masters of 1970s soft rock. Pitchfork Media's Sam Sodomsky gave a more mixed review of 6.5 out of 10, writing that he has some limitations as a songwriter but "makes a compelling case for Heidecker as a musician... [this is] his fullest musical statement yet". Vish Khanna of Exclaim! gave the album eight out of 10, summing up that it "is rich in raw songs, often short and sardonic, that revel in Tim Heidecker's unique ability to live a creative life replete with profundity and utterly misanthropic sentiments. Nobody does it better."

Track listing
All songs written by Tim Heidecker
"Illegal" – 2:49
"When I Get Up" – 2:39
"What the Brokenhearted Do" – 3:41
"Funeral Shoes" – 3:04
"I'm Not Good Enough" – 2:10
"Sometimes It Happens This Way" – 4:40
"Insomnia" – 2:31
"Coffee's Gone Cold" – 3:28
"I Don't Think About You (Much Anymore)" – 3:34
"Finally Getting Over" – 3:07
"Life's Too Long" – 1:37

Personnel
Tim Heidecker – guitar, vocals

Jonathan Rado – production

See also
List of 2019 albums

References

External links

2019 albums
Jagjaguwar albums
Tim Heidecker albums
Country rock albums by American artists
Folk rock albums by American artists
Indie rock albums by American artists
Concept albums
Albums produced by Jonathan Rado